Jul Haganæs (22 August 1932 – 3 April 2013) was a Norwegian poet, non-fiction writer and journalist.

He was born in Aurdal and grew up on the farm Flagesletten. Between his début with Aprilnetter in 1965 and his last outing with Nattens bilder in 2004, he released thirteen poetry collections in total. These were translated to both Swedish, Finnish, Icelandic and Polish. He also wrote non-fiction, among others biographies about Ola Viker and Sigurd Lybeck, as well as Nu god Nat min Ven about Knut Hamsun. He also worked as a journalist in Valdres and Samhold.

References 

1932 births
2013 deaths
People from Nord-Aurdal
21st-century Norwegian poets
Norwegian male poets
Norwegian non-fiction writers
Norwegian journalists
Norwegian biographers
20th-century Norwegian poets
20th-century Norwegian male writers
21st-century Norwegian male writers
Male biographers
Male non-fiction writers